A24, a film distribution company based in New York City, was launched by Daniel Katz, David Fenkel, and John Hodges in August 2012. Its first film, A Glimpse Inside the Mind of Charles Swan III, was released on February 8, 2013. That same year, the company entered multi-year distribution deals with Amazon Prime and DirecTV Cinema. The company gained recognition with their North American release of Spring Breakers in 2013. At the 2016 Academy Awards, films released the previous year by A24 received seven nominations: Amy won for Best Documentary Feature, Ex Machina won for Best Visual Effects, and Brie Larson was awarded Best Actress for her performance in Room. A24 became a production studio in 2016 as well, fully financing its first feature film, Moonlight, in a partnership with Plan B Entertainment. The film was released to universal acclaim and won three Academy Awards from eight nominations, including Best Picture.

As of 2023, Greta Gerwig's Lady Bird (2017) and Bo Burnham's Eighth Grade (2018) are A24's highest-rated films on Rotten Tomatoes, with a 99% approval rating for each. In 2018 and 2019, respectively, the studio announced multi-year partnerships with Apple TV+ and Showtime Networks for the digital releases of some of its upcoming films. Lamb (2021) was the first A24-distributed movie selected as a country's official entry for the Academy Award for Best International Feature Film. Everything Everywhere All at Once (2022) is A24's highest-grossing film with over $100 million in box office earnings; the film is also the recipient of many accolades and seven Academy Awards, including Best Picture.

2010s

2020s

Upcoming

Dated films

Undated films

Notes

References

External links
 

 
A24
A24